The 2011 FIA GT1 Zolder round is an auto racing event held at the Circuit Zolder in Heusden-Zolder, Belgium.  Taking place over 8–10 April 2011, the Zolder event will be the second round of the 2011 FIA GT1 World Championship season.  It is the first time the series has visited Zolder, replacing the previous Belgian round at Circuit de Spa-Francorchamps, although the FIA GT Championship previously utilized Zolder in 2009.  The race weekend is shared with rounds of the Belcar Endurance Championship and the Belgian Touring Car Series.

Background

Much of the teams that featured in Abu Dhabi return two weeks later for Zolder, with only the No. 9 Belgian Ford making an alteration to their driver line-up.  Fabien Giroix and Antoine Leclerc are replaced by Mathias Beche and local driver Vanina Ickx.  Ickx had previously planned to drive in Abu Dhabi, but seating issues forced her to withdraw prior to the event.  Following their Championship Race victory in Abu Dhabi, Clivio Piccione and Stef Dusseldorp enter Zolder at the leaders in the Drivers' Championship by three points over Peter Dumbreck and Richard Westbrook, while their Hexis AMR team leads the Teams' Championship over JR Motorsports by eleven points.  As a result of their success in Abu Dhabi, Hexis' No. 3 Aston Martin will carry  of success ballast.  The No. 22 JR Motorsports Nissan will carry  after finishing on the podium in both Qualifying and Championship races, while the No. 38 Münnich Motorsport Lamborghini will carry .

Qualifying

Qualifying result
For qualifying, Driver 1 participates in the first and third sessions while Driver 2 participates in only the second session.  The fastest lap for each session is indicated with bold.

 The No. 7 Young Driver Aston Martin, No. 11 Exim Bank Corvette, No. 23 JR Motorsport Nissan, No. 38 Münnich Lamborghini, No. 20 Sumo Power Nissan, and No. 40 Marc VDS Ford were all penalized three grid spaces for the Qualifying Race for failing to slow for a yellow flag during the pre-qualifying practice session.

Races

Qualifying Race

Race result

Championship Race

Race result

References

External links
 Zolder GT1 Race in Belgium – FIA GT1 World Championship

Zolder
FIA GT1
Circuit Zolder